Superclásico is the football match in Argentina between Buenos Aires rivals Boca Juniors and River Plate. It derives from the Spanish usage of "clásico" to mean derby, with the prefix "super" used as the two clubs are the most popular and successful clubs in Argentine football. In fact, the term 'Clásico' originated in Argentina, particularly with this match up and it was later exported to other countries such as Spain and Mexico. According to some statistics, they commandeer more than 70% of all Argentine football fans between them.

The Superclásico is known worldwide as one of the fiercest and most important derbies. In April 2004, the English newspaper The Observer put the Superclásico at the top of their list of "50 sporting things you must do before you die", saying that "Derby day in Buenos Aires makes the Old Firm game look like a primary school kick-about", and in 2016 the British football magazine FourFourTwo considered it the "biggest derby in the world". That same year The Daily Telegraph ranked this match as the "biggest club rivalry in world football", and the Daily Mirror placed it number one in the top 50 football derbies in the world, above El Clásico between Barcelona and Real Madrid, in 2017.

Origins and background

The two clubs Boca and River Plate both have origins in La Boca, the working class dockland area of Buenos Aires, with River being founded in 1901 and Boca in 1905. River, however, moved to the affluent district of Núñez in the north of the city in 1925. Since then, Boca Juniors has been known as the club of Argentina's working class or the people's club, with many Boca fans coming from the local Italian immigrant community. Boca fans are actually known as "Xeneizes" ("Genoese"). By contrast, River Plate became known by the nickname, Los Millonarios (The Millionaires), with a supposedly upper-class support base. Both clubs, however, have supporters from all social classes.

By 1913, both club had their fields in La Boca and had not won any league, being also far away from the popularity that would come after. The most known Argentine football rivalry until then had been Alumni–Belgrano A.C. (both clubs from Belgrano) until Alumni disbanded in 1911 and Belgrano disaffiliated from the AFA. Racing Club de Avellaneda became the first of the Big Five when that same year won the first of their seven consecutive league titles.

Before their first official match, Boca and River had played two friendlies (1908 and 1912). River Plate's nickname was Darseneros (the most popular Millonarios came in 1931). The match was played on August 24, 1913 at Racing Club Stadium, with River winning 2–1. 7,000 spectators attended the match, and goals were scored by Cándido García and Antonio Ameal Pereyra (River) and Marcos Meyer (Boca).

The Superclásico is particularly noted for the passion of the fans, with what the BBC describe as "a sea of colourful flowing banners, screams and roars, chanting, dancing and never-ending fireworks". Both sets of supporters sing passionate chants aimed at their rivals, often based on popular Argentine rock band tunes. Each stadium, Boca's La Bombonera and River's El Monumental are known to bounce with the simultaneous jumping of the fans. At times, the matches have been known to end in fights between the "barra brava" (violent factions) of both sides or with the police.

Boca fans refer to River supporters as "gallinas" ("chickens") claiming the lack of guts of River players. Despite the fact that their club traces back its roots to La Boca, River fans refer to their Boca rivals as "los chanchitos" ("little pigs") because they claim their stadium, located in the less affluent La Boca area, smells most of the time, as well as "bosteros" ("manure collectors"), a reference to the smell of a polluted river in La Boca. Another infamous slur, coined in the late 1990s over remarks of Boca's forward Diego Latorre, is to brand Boca Juniors as "The Cabaret", due to the alleged aspiration of some players to steal the limelight.

The rivalry between the two clubs can also affect players, particularly those who are transferred between the two clubs. Cataldo Spitale was the first to make the change, when he left Boca to sign for River in 1933. Oscar Ruggeri, who moved to River from Boca in 1985 said, "It's not easy I can tell you. One side looks on you as a traitor and the other doesn't really trust you. You need time to adapt and a lot of character to win people over." Some players have gone so far as to state that they would not play for the other club such as River's Uruguayan player Enzo Francescoli while Diego Maradona during his time playing for Argentinos Juniors, refused to even consider a move to El Monumental, stating that his dream was to play for Boca. In 1992, José Luis Villarreal won the league title with Boca, and left the following year to River. Although he was received very well by River fans, and won the 1993 and 1994 league titles there, Boca fans never forgave him, and he says he hasn't been to La Bombonera since then to avoid problems. 

Recently, on March 21 in the Clausura 2010 tournament, the two teams started playing in La Bombonera. In the ninth minute of play, the match was suspended because of heavy rainfall in Buenos Aires. The pitch was practically flooded, but in spite of this, referee Héctor Baldassi stated that the match could be played. In the course of the match, the two teams were unable to keep possession because the ball became repeatedly bogged down. The match restarted four days later, on March 25, and was played with two halves of 41 minutes. This was the first Superclásico suspended in history.

Puerta 12 tragedy

On June 23, 1968, in El Monumental, after a 0–0 match between the two teams, 71 fans were killed in a crush at gate 12, with 150 fans left injured. The disaster was the worst incident in the history of Argentine football and the majority of the dead were teenagers and young adults; the average age of the victims was 19. There are various claims as to what exactly happened that day. Some claim that the disaster happened after Boca Juniors fans threw burning River flags from the upper tiers of the stadium, causing a stampede of their own fans in the lower tier.

Others claim that it happened after River fans arrived at the Boca section, causing the stampede of the visiting fans. Yet others claim that gate 12 was locked, or would not open at the time, and that the fans at the back did not hear the ones at the front telling them to stop coming in. William Kent, River's former president, claimed that the police were the culprits, as they began repressing Boca fans after they had thrown urine at them from the stands. Some witnesses claim that the turnstiles to the exit were blocked by a huge iron pole.

After three years of investigation, a government inquiry found no one guilty, much to the disappointment of the families of the victims. Since the tragedy, the gates at El Monumental have been identified by letters instead of numbers.

At the end of the 1968 season, the 68 football clubs in the Argentine Football Association collected 100,000 pesos for the families of the deceased.

From River's relegation to the 2018 Copa Libertadores Finals

Since the turn of the century, the rivalry has intensified to different levels. A series of fierce meetings and violent events rekindled international attention to the derby.

Boca eliminated River in the 2000 Copa Libertadores and 2004 Copa Libertadores, winning the title in 2000, 2001 and 2003, and reaching the finals in 2004. Moreover, in June 2011, River was relegated for the first time in its history.

Since its promotion in 2012, River eliminated Boca in the 2014 Copa Sudamericana, 2015 Copa Libertadores, 2017 Supercopa Argentina, 2018 Copa Libertadores, and the 2019 Copa Libertadores, lifting the trophy on all of those occasions, except the 2019 Copa Libertadores.

During the 2015 Copa Libertadores, River Plate players were attacked at half time by a Boca fan that spread pepper spray as the players were entering the dressing rooms. As a result, the game was suspended and River were awarded the qualification. Boca, on the other hand, were disqualified from competition in the tournament and were faced with sanctions imposed by from CONMEBOL. At the time of the attack, River was winning the series 1–0. 

In the 2018 Copa Libertadores Finals, the bus carrying Boca's players to the El Monumental was attacked by River fans who threw large objects after the police withdrew from the zone. The game was suspended and despite Boca's requests to have River disqualified, the game was moved to Madrid at the Santiago Bernabéu Stadium. After drawing 2–2 at La Bombonera and losing its home field advantage, River famously won the game 3–1 after extra time (5–3 on aggregate). Through the series, Boca was always ahead until the extra time of the return leg. Given the rivalry and the stage, and the fact of having been played in Europe, the 2018 Copa Libertadores Finals gathered unusual attention outside South America.

Statistics

Overall record
. Only official matches are included.

Notes

Primera División matches
Includes only matches in the Primera División since their first official game in 1913.

Notes

Keys

Head-to-head statistics in Primera División

National cups
These are only matches in national cup competitions. The club name in bold indicates a win. The score is given at full-time, in the goals columns the goal scorer and time when goal was scored is noted.

Notes

Keys

Head-to-head statistics in national cups

Copa Libertadores
These are only matches in the Copa Libertadores, club name in bold indicate win. The score is given at full-time, in the goals columns the goal scorer and time when goal was scored is noted.

Notes 

Keys

Head-to-head statistics in the Copa Libertadores

Other international cups
These are only matches in other international cups. The club name in bold indicates a win. The score is given at full-time, in the goals columns the goal scorer and time when goal was scored is noted.

Notes

Keys

Head-to-head statistics in other international cups

Friendly matches
List of all the non-official games played since their first match ever in 1908:

Notes

Keys

Head-to-head statistics in Friendlies matches

Single eliminations between the two rivals
As of 2021, 20 single eliminations between Boca Juniors and River Plate had been played, three of them tournament's finals. River holds the upper hand, with 13 wins over Boca.

 1915 Copa Competencia: Boca 1–1 River; River 4–2 Boca (River won)
 1918 Copa Competencia: River 1–0 Boca (River won)
 1937 Primera División: River 5–3 Boca (River won)
 1942 Copa Adrián C. Escobar semifinal: River 0–0 Boca (River won 3–2 on corner kicks)
 1946 Copa de Competencia Británica semi-final: Boca 2–0 River (Boca won)
 1969 Metropolitano semifinal: River 0–0 Boca (River won)
 1972 Nacional semifinal: River 3–2 Boca (River won)
 1976 Nacional final: Boca 1–0 River (Boca won)
 1989 Liguilla Pre-Libertadores requalifying final: River 0–0 Boca; Boca 0–0 River; Boca 1–2 River (River won)
 1993 Copa Centenario: Boca 0–0 River; River 1–0 Boca (River won) 
 1994 Supercopa Libertadores: River 0–0 Boca; Boca 1–1 River (Boca won 5–4 by penalty shoot-out)
 2000 Copa Libertadores quarterfinals: River 2–1 Boca; Boca 3–0 River (Boca won)
 2004 Copa Libertadores semifinals: Boca 1–0 River; River 2–1 Boca (Boca won 5–4 by penalty shoot-out)
 2014 Copa Sudamericana semifinals: Boca 0–0 River; River 1–0 Boca (River won)
 2015 Copa Libertadores round of 16: River 1–0 Boca; Boca 0–0 River (River won)
 2017 Supercopa Argentina final: Boca 0–2 River (River won)
 2018 Copa Libertadores Finals: Boca 2–2 River; River 3–1 Boca (River won)
 2019 Copa Libertadores semifinals: River 2–0 Boca; Boca 1–0 River (River won)
 2021 Copa de la Liga Profesional quarterfinals: Boca 1–1 River (Boca won 4–2 by penalty shoot-out)
2019–20 Copa Argentina round of 16: Boca 0–0 River (Boca won 4–1 by penalty shoot-out)

Notes

Match records

Player records

Players who have played for both clubs 
List of 100 players who have played for Boca Juniors and River Plate

Donato Abbatángelo
Antonio Ameal Pereyra
Severiano Álvarez
Gabriel Amato
Agustín Angotti
Abel Balbo
Juan C. Barberis
Eduardo Bargas
Carlos Barisio
Gabriel Batistuta
Sergio Berti
Nicolás Bertolo
Camilo Bonelli
Claudio Cabrera
Julio César Cáceres
Fernando Cáceres
Eugenio Cacopardo
Zoilo Canavery
Claudio Caniggia
Gabriel Cedrés
Ramón Centurión
Francisco Aníbal Cibeyra
Victorio Cocco
Pablo Agustín Comelles
Hugo Coscia
Rubén da Silva
Alberto De Zorzi
Roque Ditro
Jorge Diz
Alfredo Elli
Pablo Erbín
Jonathan Fabbro
Casildo Fallatti
Jorge Hugo Fernández
Ramón Ferreiro
Luciano Figueroa
Anempodisto García
Demóstenes Gaete
Rubén Horacio Galletti
Fernando Gamboa
Antonio Ganduglia
Alfredo Garasini
Ricardo Gareca
Hugo Gatti
Rubén Darío Gómez
Rafael Hernández
Jorge Higuaín
Néstor Isella
Ramón Lamique
Agustín Lanata
Miguel Ángel Loayza
Juan Francisco Lombardo
Carlos López
Juan José López
José Luis Luna
Jonathan Maidana
Alfredo Martín
Joaquín Martínez
Jorge Daniel Martínez
Ernesto Mastrángelo
Milton Melgar
Jesús Méndez
Norberto Menéndez
Pedro Moltedo
José Manuel Moreno
Carlos Manuel Morete
Juan José Negri
Julio Olarticoechea
Vicente Oñate
Alberto Juan Penney
Osvaldo Pérez
Dante Pertini
Juan José Pizzuti
Lucas Pratto
Sebastián Rambert
Carlos Randazzo
Gerardo Reinoso
Jorge Rinaldi
Miguel Ángel Rodríguez
Alfredo Rojas
Iseo Fausto Rosello
Oscar Ruggeri
Francisco Sá
Carlos Horacio Salinas
Juan Amador Sánchez
Daniel Silguero
Luis Solans
Cataldo Spitale
Ricardo Stagi
Francisco Taggino
Fabio Talarico
Carlos Daniel Tapia
Alberto Tarantini
Julio César Toresani
Víctor Trossero
Juan Vairo
José Luis Villarreal
Nelson Vivas
Hugo Zarich
Ricardo Zatelli
Bruno Urribarri

Players who played for one club in youth career and for rival club in senior career 

Carlos Peucelle (youth career Boca Juniors, senior career River Plate)
Ernesto Grillo (youth career River Plate, senior career Boca Juniors)
Mariano Pavone (youth career Boca Juniors, senior career River Plate)
Milan Borjan (youth career Boca Juniors, senior career River Plate)
Nicolás Sánchez (youth career Boca Juniors, senior career River Plate)
Matías Marchesini (youth career River Plate and Boca Juniors, senior career Boca Juniors)

Coaches who worked at both clubs 

Renato Cesarini (also was a player of River Plate)
Ferenc Plattkó
José D'Amico
Vladislao Cap (also was a player of River Plate)
Néstor Rossi (also was a player of River Plate)
Alfredo Di Stéfano (also was a player of River Plate)
Ángel Cappa (assistant coach at Boca Juniors, manager at River Plate)
José Varacka (also was a player of River Plate)
Juan Carlos Lorenzo (also was a player of Boca Juniors)
Héctor Veira
César Luis Menotti (also was a player of Boca Juniors)

Played for one club and coached the rival club 

Rogelio Domínguez (River Plate as player, Boca Juniors as coach)
Adolfo Pedernera (River Plate as player, Boca Juniors as coach)
Miguel Ángel López (River Plate as player, Boca Juniors as coach)
Claudio Borghi (River Plate as player, Boca Juniors as coach)
José Manuel Moreno (River Plate and Boca Juniors as player, Boca Juniors as coach)
Francisco Sá (River Plate and Boca Juniors as player, Boca Juniors as coach)
J.J. López (River Plate and Boca Juniors as player, River Plate as coach)

River's greatest moments
August 24, 1913: River won the first official Superclásico 3–1.
October 19, 1941: The River team of the 1940s known as "La Máquina" beat Boca 5–1, their biggest win over Boca, on their way to the Argentine championship.
July 19, 1942: River won 4–0, equaling their biggest win over Boca.
November 8, 1942: River came back from 2–0 down to a 2–2 draw, clinching the championship of that year in the home of their archrivals for first time in history.
December 8, 1955: River won the second championship at La Bombonera after a 2–1 victory over Boca.
February 10, 1966: River won 2–1 at El Monumental in a match for the 1966 Copa Libertadores, in the first ever meeting of the clubs in international competitions.
October 15, 1972: River came back from 4–2 down to win 5–4 in the highest scoring Superclásico in history.
April 6, 1986: In a game remembered for being played with an orange ball, River won 2–0 at La Bombonera right after winning the 1985–86 championship.
July 27, 1989: River won 2–1 the re-qualifying final of the 1989 Liguilla pre-Libertadores preventing Boca's qualification for Copa Libertadores 1990.
July 18, 1993: River won 1–0 in José Amalfitani Stadium, with a Walter Silvani's golden goal, to eliminate Boca from the Copa Centenario, a tournament that was to commemorate AFA's 100 years since its foundation. It was the first and only Superclásico decided with a golden goal. 
December 11, 1994: River won 3–0 at La Bombonera, securing the 1994 Apertura.
March 23, 1997: River came back from 3–0 down to draw 3–3, costing Boca a famous win at El Monumental
March 10, 2002: River won 3–0 at La Bombonera on their way to win the 2002 Clausura.
May 16, 2004: River won a decisive match at La Bombonera 1–0 with a goal from Fernando Cavenaghi, paving the way to win the 2004 Clausura.
October 8, 2006: River defeated Boca 3–1 at El Monumental, breaking Boca's 22 game undefeated streak
October 7, 2007: River won 2–0 at home to prevent Boca from going top of the table and damaged their chances of winning the 2007 Apertura.
March 31, 2014: River defeated Boca 2–1 at La Bombonera with a goal from defender Ramiro Funes Mori after 10 years without winning at Boca's stadium. Later they clinched the Final 2014 championship.
November 27, 2014: River defeated Boca 1–0 at El Monumental in the second leg of the 2014 Copa Sudamericana semifinals with a goal from Leonardo Pisculichi. The game was also memorable for the fact that goalkeeper Marcelo Barovero saved a penalty in the opening minutes of the game. River won 1–0 on aggregate and advanced to the finals for the first time since 2003. Boca were knocked out from an international competition by River for the first time in 28 years.
May 7, 2015: River defeated Boca 1–0 at El Monumental in the first leg of the 2015 Copa Libertadores round of 16 with a goal from Carlos Sánchez from the penalty spot. In the second leg, the game was abandoned at half-time after River players were attacked with pepper spray by Boca fans, with the score still 0–0. The match was terminated and Boca were disqualified from the tournament. River would go on to win the cup for the first time since 1996 and for the third time in club history.
March 14, 2018: River took revenge of the 1976 defeat in the Nacional championship final by beating Boca 2–0 to win the 2017 Supercopa Argentina in the Estadio Malvinas Argentinas, Mendoza. The match was the second ever final between the two adversaries.
December 9, 2018: After drawing 2–2 at La Bombonera in the first leg of 2018 Copa Libertadores Finals, the second leg was postponed due to River fans throwing objects at the Boca bus, injuring several players. CONMEBOL controversially decided to play the second leg at the Santiago Bernabéu Stadium in Madrid, Spain, as Boca refused to play the second leg and River defended their right to play it at home. In Madrid, River would come back to win 3–1 in extra time in the first ever meeting between the two in an international competition final and Copa Libertadores finals.

Boca's greatest moments
August 2, 1908: Boca won the first Superclásico ever 4–1.
December 23, 1928: Boca defeated River 6–0, the biggest win in Superclásico history, with two goals from Domingo Tarasconi, Roberto Cherro and Esteban Kuko.
May 19, 1959: After 18 years Boca avenged their 5–1 defeat by River with a 5–1 win at La Bombonera with two goals from Jose Yudica.
December 9, 1962: Boca defeated River 1–0 at La Bombonera to secure the top position of 1962 championship, which they won in the next round. This match is well remembered by Boca's fans, because Antonio Roma stopped a penalty kick by Delem in the final minutes of the match.
December 14, 1969: Despite River's recovery from a 0–2 down, Boca won the national championship in the home of their arch-rivals after a 2–2 drawn.
February 3, 1974: Carlos García Cambón scored four goals on his Boca debut in a 5–2 win, the most goals scored by a single player in the Superclásico. It was also Boca's second successive 5–2 win.
December 22, 1976: Boca won the first ever final between the two clubs 1–0 to claim the 1976 Nacional championship.
April 10, 1981: Boca won 3–0 on their way to winning the 1981 Metropolitano championship, with a famous goal scored by Maradona against Ubaldo Fillol.
March 7, 1982: Boca won 5–1 at El Monumental, in the 1982 Nacional championship, the biggest away win in the history of the Superclásico. Due to a contractual conflict, River played the match with youth players.
February 27, 1991: Boca came back from 3–1 down to win 4–3 in the highest scoring Superclásico in Copa Libertadores history.
March 31, 1991: Boca won its fifth consecutive derby of the year 1–0 at La Bombonera.
July 14, 1996: Claudio Caniggia scored a hat-trick to help Boca win 4–1 at La Bombonera, barely a month after River won the 1996 Copa Libertadores.
September 29, 1996: Boca won 3–2 at La Bombonera, with a neck goal from Hugo Romeo Guerra in injury time.
May 24, 2000: Having lost the first leg of the 2000 Copa Libertadores quarter-final 2–1 at El Monumental, Boca won 3–0 at home to progress to the semi-final and later go on to win the competition and the Intercontinental Cup. Boca's third goal was scored by substitute Martín Palermo after a six-month injury.
November 9, 2003: Boca, then champions of the 2003 Copa Libertadores, won 2–0 at El Monumental with goals scored by Brazilian striker Iarley and Sebastián Battaglia on their way to lift the Apertura 2003 title.
June 17, 2004: Having won the first leg of the 2004 Copa Libertadores semi-final 1–0 at La Bombonera, Boca went to El Monumental, where River scored first. With just five minutes left Carlos Tevez scored to level the score 1–1 and so give Boca a 2–1 aggregate lead. However, a last-minute goal by Cristián Nasuti for River took the match to penalties. Boca then won the penalty shootout 5–4.
 May 4, 2008: Boca won 1–0 at La Bombonera with a goal by Sebastián Battaglia.
October 18, 2008: Ten-man Boca won 1–0 at El Monumental on their way to winning the 2008 Apertura.
January 31, 2015: At a friendly match in Mendoza, Boca won 5–0 and three River Plate players were red carded, being it the biggest win in the professional football era of the Superclásico.
December 11, 2016: Boca came back from 2–1 down in the half-time to win 4–2 at El Monumental with two goals scored by returning idol Carlos Tevez.

Honours

Official titles

References

External links

 Buenos Aires Derby by Pablo Ciullini at the RSSSF
 River Plate - Boca Juniors: la Batalla del Río de la Plata on Pablo Geraldes blog (29 Aug 2019)  
 Super-classic! An inside look at one of the game’s most wild rivalries on South American Futbol.com

Argentine football rivalries
Boca Juniors
Club Atlético River Plate
Football in Buenos Aires
Nicknamed sporting events